The Li Kwoh-ting's Residence is a former house of Li Kwoh-ting in Zhongzheng District, Taipei, Taiwan.

History
Li moved to the house in 1972 after he was appointed Minister of Finance by President Chiang Kai-shek in 1969.
He lived in the house until his death on 31 May 2001. In 2002, the house was listed as historical building by Taipei City Government.

Architecture
The house was designed with Japanese architectural style. The building consists of living room, dining room, bedroom and two study rooms.

Transportation
The house is accessible within walking distance southwest from Zhongxiao Xinsheng Station of Taipei Metro.

See also
 List of tourist attractions in Taiwan

References

External links

 

Houses in Taiwan
Tourist attractions in Taipei